This is a list of notable Ajax frameworks, used for creating web applications with a dynamic link between the client and the server. Some of the frameworks are JavaScript compilers, for generating JavaScript and Ajax that runs in the web browser client; some are pure JavaScript libraries; others are server-side frameworks that typically rely on JavaScript libraries.

JavaScript

JavaScript frameworks are browser-side frameworks very commonly used in Ajax development. 
There are hundreds of JavaScript frameworks available. According to latest surveys, the most used JavaScript frameworks are:

Other notable frameworks that are more AJAX specific, and not among the list of general purpose frameworks:
 AJAX.OOP, an open source framework, it provides an OOP-style programming engine and Ajax requests-handling functionality to create web 2.0 components.
 Bindows, an enterprise Ajax framework, with Windows look and feel
qooxdoo, is a comprehensive Ajax application framework. Leveraging object-oriented JavaScript allows developers to build cross-browser applications.
 SproutCore, designed to make desktop-like apps for the web
 Wakanda Framework, works on top of WakandaDB with Server-Side JavaScript, designed to build interfaces for desktop & mobile Web applications.
 Webix, an JavaScript framework for developing unique user interfaces with DataTable, SpreadSheet, Pivot, Kanban, File Manager, Scheduler widgets.

Java

These frameworks use Java for server-side Ajax operations:

 Apache Wicket an open-source Java server-centric framework supporting Ajax development
 AribaWeb an open-source framework with Reflection and Object-Relational mapping
 DWR Direct Web Remoting
 Echo for Ajax servlets
 FormEngine a framework for easy creation of dynamic forms
 Google Web Toolkit a widget library with a Java to JavaScript compiler
 ItsNat a server-side Java framework focused on single-page interface applications
 JackBe enterprise Ajax framework
 JSF Java Server Faces
 RAP Eclipse Rich Ajax Platform
 JBoss RichFaces, ICEfaces and PrimeFaces open-source Ajax component libraries for JavaServer Faces
 Vaadin a server-side Java widget framework depending on GWT
 ZK an open-source Java server+client fusion Ajax framework depending on jQuery and XUL

.NET

The following frameworks are available for the Windows .NET platform:

 ASP.NET AJAX (previously Microsoft Atlas)

Perl

 Catalyst, Catalyst::Plugin::Prototype or other js frameworks

PHP

A PHP Ajax framework is able to deal with database, search data, and build pages or parts of page and publish the page or return data to the XMLHttpRequest object.

Quicknet is an Ajax framework that provides secure data transmission, uses PHP on the server side
 Sajax PHP framework with a lot of functions, easy to integrate functions yourself
 Xajax uses JSON or XML format, on the server side

Python

These frameworks use Python for client-side Ajax operations:

 Pyjs, a widget library with a Python to JavaScript compiler.

Ruby

The Ruby on Rails framework used to implement a Domain-specific language named RJS, which can be used to write Ruby code that generates Javascript code. The code generated by RJS was usually loaded using Ajax, e.g. by using Ajax-enabled helper methods Ruby on Rails provides, such as the link_to_remote helper. It was replaced by jQuery as of Rails 3.1

Many of the Ruby on Rails Ajax-enabled helper methods used to work by using Prototype to perform an Ajax request in older versions of Rails. In most cases Javascript code is returned by the server to be executed by the browser, unlike the usual case where Ajax is used to retrieve data in XML or JSON format.

See also

 Ajax framework
 Web service
 Ajax

References

Ajax frameworks